In historical linguistics, the German term  ("grammatical alternation") refers to the effects of Verner's law when they are viewed synchronically within the paradigm of a Germanic verb.

Overview
According to Grimm's law, the Proto-Indo-European (PIE) voiceless stops *p, *t, *k and *kʷ usually became Proto-Germanic *f, *θ (dental fricative), *x and *xʷ (velar fricative). Karl Verner identified the principle that these instead become the voiced consonants *b, *d, *g, *gʷ if they were word-internal and immediately preceded by an unaccented vowel in PIE. Furthermore, PIE *s, which usually came into Germanic unchanged, became *z in this position; Proto-Germanic *z later became North- and West Germanic *r.

Consequently, five pairs of consonants emerged, each pair representing a single PIE phoneme. The following table shows the precise developments from Proto-Indo-European through Proto-Germanic to Old Norse, West Germanic, Old English, Old High German and Middle Dutch. Note that this table lists only the outcome of word-internal consonants, since word-initial consonants were generally not affected by Verner's law.

In Old English, the fricatives took the voiced allophones ,  and  when they were word-internal, and in Middle Dutch also when word-initial; see: Pronunciation of English ⟨th⟩. In Old High German, the stops were moved according to the High German consonant shift. Likewise,  and  merged in almost all Germanic languages (except Gothic and German), eliminating this variety early on. In Old Norse,  and  likewise merged altogether.

Within verb paradigms
 is the phenomenon that a verb which in PIE had a stem ending in one of these phonemes displays a differing reflex in different parts of the paradigm, a result of the movable nature of accent in PIE. The Germanic past tense derives from the PIE perfect aspect, which was always athematic and therefore almost always had a shift of accent between the singular indicative (where it was on the root syllable) and the remaining forms including the past participle (where it was on the ending). However, the perfect aspect was only present in primary, underived verbs, and any derived verbs therefore lacked perfect forms altogether. These latter verbs formed the base of the Germanic weak verbs, and did not inherit the accent shift, so the alternation itself only affects Germanic strong verbs.

A process of levelling has meant that there are only few examples of this in the modern languages. In Old English, too, the levelling had already begun to the extent that in some verbs the preterite singular had taken the consonant of the preterite plural. The only surviving example in Modern English is was:were, but a trace can also be seen in the adjective forlorn, which reflects the old participle of the verb to lose, or sodden, which is originally a participle of seethe. This latter is parallelled by German sieden, sott, gesotten. German also features d:t in leiden, litt, gelitten ("to suffer") and schneiden, schnitt, geschnitten ("to cut"). One example of h:g is ziehen, zog, gezogen ("to pull"). All other cases have been levelled. Apart from the English copula mentioned above, the only occurrences of s:r in the modern languages are in Dutch: for example verliezen, verloor, verloren ("to lose") and verkiezen, verkoos, verkoren ("to choose").

Some examples:

 *f ~ *b (no examples in the modern languages) 
 Old English: hebban – hōf hōfon hafen ("to lift", cf. heave)

 *þ ~ *d (survives in modern German)
 Old English: cweþan (cwiþþ) cwæþ – cwǣdon cweden ("to say", cf. quoth)
 Old English: sēoþan (sīeþþ) sēaþ – sudon soden ("to boil", cf. seethe)
 Modern German: schneiden – schnitt geschnitten ("to cut")

 *h ~ *g (survives in modern Dutch and modern German)
 Middle High German: zîhen zêch – zigen gezigen ("to upbraid")
 Old English: þeon (þīehþ) þāh – þigon þigen ("to prosper", cf. German gedeihen)
 Modern Dutch: slaan sla - sloeg geslagen ("to hit", Dutch lost intervocalic h)
 Modern German: ziehen - zog, gezogen ("to pull", the intervocalic h is not pronounced)

 *hw ~ *gw/w/g (survives in modern Dutch)
 Old English: sēon seah – sāwon sewen ("to see", Old English lost intervocalic h)
 (Remnant in Modern English spelling: see – saw)
 Old High German: sehan sah – sāgun gisehan/gisewan
 Modern Dutch: zien zie gezien – zag zagen ("to see", Dutch lost intervocalic h)
 Modern Swedish: se ser – såg

 *s ~ *z (survives in modern Dutch, and in the English copula)
 Old English: wesan, wæs – wǣron ("to be")
 Modern English: was – were
 Old English: cēosan, cēas – curon coren ("to choose")
 Old English: frēosan, frēas – fruron froren ("to freeze")
 Old Norse (early): vesa, vas – váru ("to be", the -s- was soon replaced by -r- analogically)
 Old Norse: frjósa, frýss – fruru, frorinn ("to freeze")
 Modern Dutch: wezen, wees, was – waren ("to be")
 Modern Dutch: verliezen, verlies – verloor, verloren ("to lose") 
 Modern Dutch: vriezen, vries – vroor, gevroren ("to freeze")

NB. The consonant alternation in certain weak verbs which typically goes along with the  phenomenon (think:thought, German denken:dachte) is a result of a later development in Germanic known as the Germanic spirant law. Likewise, the terminal devoicing which produces a fortis-lenis alternation in Dutch (wrijven:wreef) is an unrelated historical phenomenon.

Between strong verbs and derived causatives
In PIE, causative verbs (meaning "to cause to") were derived from verb roots with a suffix *-éye-, and the root vowel was changed to the o-grade. Verbs with this suffix eventually became part of the first weak class (*-jan verbs). This suffix always bore the accent, and the verb root never did, while in regular strong verbs the verb root was accented in the present tense. This caused Verner alternation between the original verbs and the causative verbs derived from them.

Examples are numerous in the older languages but are less frequent today, because some levelling has occurred, and in some cases, one verb or the other was lost.

 *f ~ *b
 Although technically not a strong verb - causative pair, modern Dutch shows the alternation in a verb with the same underlying Proto-Germanic shape.  
heffen ("to lift/raise", from the strong verb *habjaną) - hebben ("to have", from the weak verb *habjaną)

 *þ ~ *d
 Modern German: leiden ("to suffer, to undergo", originally "to go", from *līþaną) – leiten ("to lead", from *laidijaną)

 *h ~ *g
 Modern Icelandic: hlæja ("to laugh", from *hlahjaną) – hlægja ("to make laugh", from *hlōgijaną)

 *hw ~ *gw/w/g (No attested examples within a single language)
 Gothic þreihan ("to press", from *þrinhwaną) – German drängen ("to push", from *þrangwijaną)

 *s ~ *z
 Modern English: rise (from *rīsaną) – rear (from *raizijaną)
 Modern Dutch: genezen ("to heal", from *ganesaną) – generen ("to take care of oneself", from *nazjaną)
 Modern German: genesen ("to heal", from *ganesaną) – nähren ("to feed", from *nazjaną)

In other parts of speech
The term  was originally applied to any pair of etymologically-related words that had different accent placement, including also Proto-Indo-European athematic nouns. The alternations in nouns were largely eliminated early on in Germanic, but a few cases exist of parallel forms being still preserved in different Germanic languages (such as English glass and Icelandic gler, an example of the s-z alternation). No attested language, old or modern, shows any alternation in noun paradigms, however.

Notes

References

Linguistic morphology
Language histories
Indo-European linguistics
Germanic languages
German words and phrases
History of the German language